Thử Thách cùng bước nhảy: So You Think You Can Dance season 2 is the second season of So You Think You Can Dance Vietnamese franchise. Chí Anh and Tuyết Minh come back to the judge position in the show with fellow guest judge John Huy, Việt Max, Viết Thành etc. Trấn Thành hosts the show once again, but he is absent during the first audition weeks, replaced temporarily by Trần Khởi My.

Auditions
Open auditions for the season two are held bigger, in the following six locations:

HCMC week
The Ho Chi Minh City callbacks will be held in Ho Chi Minh City. 116 participating contestants will be cut down through successive rounds to a Top 20 who will be announced live during a dancer showcase episode.

Finals

Top 20 Finalists

Females

Males

Elimination Chart

 Due to the national funeral honor for General Giáp, the show skipped one week of broadcasting and came back as usual on October 19 for the performance show and on October 20 for the results show.
 Ngọc Tiên was forced to leave for good after discovering pregnancy. Thuỳ Vân was brought back immediately to support Thái Sơn, Tiên's partner. Voting line is open merely for Thái Sơn and only one male is evicted that week, instead of a couple.

Syndication

References

External links
The official site of SYTYCD VN
SYTYCD on Facebook page
SYTYCD on ZingMe page
YouTube channel of SYTYCD VN

Season 02
2010s Vietnamese television series
2013 Vietnamese television seasons